Turres in Byzacena was a Roman and Vandal era colonia (city) in North Africa.

The exact location of the town is unknown but is probably the ruins at Tamarza or nearby ruins of Msilica.  Tamarza is located close to the Algerian border, 70 km from Tozeur and is surrounded by steep and arid wild country. The site is renowned for its clear water cascades and springs that irrigate the town's park.

Bishopric 

Turres in Byzacena was the site of an early bishopric in Roman times. The diocese ceased to function with the arrival of Islam in the 680sAD, but remains a titular see of the Roman Catholic Church in the province of Byzacena.

Bishops

 Juan Carlos Aramburu Bishop of Buenos Aires (Argentina)  June 14, 1967 – April 22, 1975
 Bonifácio Piccinini Bishop of Cuiabá (Brazil)   June 27, 1975 – August 15, 1981
 Manuel Salazar y Espinoza  Emeritus Bishop of Leon de Nicaragua (Nicaragua)   December 19, 1981 – August 16, 1995
 Hil Kabashi  Apostolic administrator of southern Albania  December 3, 1996

References 

Cities in Tunisia
Oases of Tunisia
Catholic titular sees in Africa
Roman towns and cities in Africa (Roman province)
Archaeological sites in Tunisia
Ruins in Tunisia
Ancient Berber cities